Dholbaha is a village of District Hoshiarpur, Punjab, India.

History 
It is a rich archaeological site reportedly in existence since prehistoric times. Based on the cache of artefacts recovered here, scholars are of the opinion that Dholbaha was among the early inhabited regions of the world. Its historical relevance was first discovered when a variety of sculptures dating back to ancient and early medieval dynasties were found lying around the village. Many of the discoveries from the Gurjara-Pratiharas and the Paramaras dynasties can now be viewed at the Hoshiarpur Archaeological Museum.
Dol Baha also has Dam, with beautiful Small Mountains

Census Data

References 

Villages in Hoshiarpur district